Illya Hlushytskyi (born 2 August 1993) is a Ukrainian football defender who plays for FC Ocean Kerch.

Career
Hlushytskyi is a product of the FC Shakhtar Donetsk youth sportive school and signed a contract with FC Shakhtar Donetsk in the Ukrainian Premier League in 2010.

He played on loan for Ukrainian clubs in the Ukrainian Second League and in the Ukrainian First League and in July 2014 went on loan for FC Hoverla in the Ukrainian Premier League.

References

External links
Profile at Official FFU Site (Ukr)

Ukrainian footballers
FC Shakhtar-3 Donetsk players
FC Olimpik Donetsk players
FC Hoverla Uzhhorod players
Association football defenders
Ukrainian Premier League players
1993 births
Living people
Sportspeople from Makiivka
FC Hirnyk-Sport Horishni Plavni players
FC Helios Kharkiv players
Crimean Premier League players